Theodore Kremer (1871–1923) was a German-born playwright whose works include The Fatal Wedding and a non-musical stage adaptation of Carmen.

Kremer’s play An Actor’s Romance opened at the Camden Theatre on 8 February 1904, starring Florence Nelson, and toured after that.

References

External links

 
 
 

1871 births
1923 deaths
American male dramatists and playwrights
19th-century American dramatists and playwrights
20th-century American dramatists and playwrights
German expatriate male actors in the United States
20th-century American male writers